LaYaka Ndwandwe was the Queen Regent of Swaziland briefly in 1780 after the death of Ngwane III until Ndvungunye became the king of Swaziland.

References

18th-century monarchs in Africa
18th-century women rulers
Swazi monarchs
Women rulers in Africa